Rajko Ostojić (born 19 February 1962) is a Croatian physician and politician. A member of the Social Democratic Party (SDP), he has been serving as Deputy Speaker of the Croatian Parliament. 

Ostojić graduated from the School of Medicine at the University of Zagreb and specialised gastroenterology and hepatology.

He first became involved in politics in 2000 when he was appointed assistant to health minister Ana Stavljenić-Rukavina, and later served a term in the 6th Sabor assembly from 2008 to 2011. Following the November 2011 election won by the centre-left Kukuriku coalition Ostojić became Croatia's Health Minister in the cabinet of Zoran Milanović in December that year.

References 

1962 births
Living people
Physicians from Zagreb
Representatives in the modern Croatian Parliament
Social Democratic Party of Croatia politicians
School of Medicine, University of Zagreb alumni
Health ministers of Croatia
Croatian gastroenterologists
Politicians from Zagreb